Isla San Damian, is an island in the Gulf of California east of the Baja California Peninsula. The island is uninhabited and is part of the Loreto Municipality.

Biology
Isla San Damian has only one species of reptile, the black-tailed brush lizard (Urosaurus nigricauda).

References

Further reading

Islands of Baja California Sur
Islands of the Gulf of California
Loreto Municipality (Baja California Sur)
Uninhabited islands of Mexico